Sir Ian Heilbron DSO FRS (6 November 1886 – 14 September 1959) was a Scottish chemist, who pioneered organic chemistry developed for therapeutic and industrial use.

Early life and education
Isidor Morris Heilbron was born in Glasgow on 6 November 1886 to a wine merchant (David Heilbron) and his wife (Fanny Jessel). He was Jewish.  

He was educated at Glasgow High School and then the Royal Technical College with G. G. Henderson. Following an award of a Carnegie Fellowship he went to the University of Leipzig to study under Arthur Rudolf Hantzsch for his doctoral thesis (1907–1910). 

He was awarded a Ph.D.  He received a D.Sc. at the University of Glasgow in 1918 for his 'Contribution to the Study of Semi-carbazones' and other papers.

Military service 
He served in the Royal Army Service Corps (1910–1920). He was awarded a Distinguished Service Order in 1918 for distinguished service related to operations in Salonika. He was also appointed an Officer of the Order of the Redeemer by the Greek government. He achieved the rank of lieutenant colonel, Assistant Director of Supplies. 

During the Second World War from 1939 to 1942 he worked as a scientific advisor to the Department of Scientific Research in the Ministry of Supply. After 1942 he became a scientific advisor to the Ministry of Production.

Career 
His independent research career focused on the chemistry of natural products, including work on sterols, vitamin D, vitamin A, polyene synthesis, Squalene, terpenes, pyrylium salts, algal pigments, and spiropyrans.  He was also instrumental in the development of DDT to fight malaria and yellow fever. Heilbron, with Arthur Herbert Cook, also studied the synthesis and structure of penicillin.

Appointments
 Lecturer, Royal Technical College, 1909–14
Scientist, later consultant at British Dyestuffs Corp. (later renamed Imperial Chemical Industries)
 Professor of organic chemistry, Royal Technical College, 1919–20
 Professor, University of Liverpool, 1920–33 (Heath Harrison Chair of Organic Chemistry)
 Professor, University of Manchester, 1933-8 (Sir Samuel Hall Chair of Chemistry, 1935-8)
 Professor of Organic Chemistry and Director of the Laboratories, Imperial College, 1938–49
1949: Retired from academic research
 Director, Brewing Industry Research Foundation, 1949–58
Chairman of the Advisory Council of the Royal Military College of Science
International Union of Pure & Applied Chemistry
Editor-in-chief of the “Dictionary of Organic Compounds” and
Chairman of the editorial board of “Thorpe’s Dictionary of Applied Chemistry.”

Notable trainees

While at University of Liverpool 

 Frank Stuart Spring, graduate student (1930)

While at University of Manchester 

 Basil Lythgoe, graduate student, (1936)
 Ewart Ray Herbert Jones, post-doc (1938)

While at Imperial College 

 Stanley H. Harper, graduate student (1937)
 Derek Harold Richard Barton, graduate student (1942)
 Basil Weedon, graduate student, (1942)
 Ralph Alexander Raphael, graduate student (1943)
 Ernest A. R. Braude, graduate student (1944)
 John Arthur Elvidge, graduate student (1947)
 Franz Sondheimer, graduate student (1948)
 Marc Julia, graduate student (1948)

While at Imperial Chemical Industries 

 Alan Woodworth Johnson, research scientist (1946)

Notable collaborators

While at University of Liverpool 
 Richard Alan Morton

Awards and honours

 1911: Fellow of the Institute of Chemistry (F.I.C.)
 1931: Fellow of the Royal Society (FRS)
 1939: Longstaff Medal of the Chemical Society of London
 1943: Davy Medal from the Royal Society "In recognition of his many notable contributions to organic chemistry, especially to the chemistry of natural products of physiological importance"
 1945: The American Chemical Society honored him with its highest prize, the Priestley Medal. This was the first time the award went to a non-American.
 1946: In recognition of his work during war he was appointed a Knight Bachelor 
 1951: Royal Medal from the Royal Society

References

1959 deaths
1886 births
British chemists
Fellows of the Royal Society
Royal Army Service Corps officers
British Jews
Jewish scientists
Knights Bachelor
Companions of the Distinguished Service Order
People educated at the High School of Glasgow
Academics of the University of Liverpool
Academics of the Victoria University of Manchester
Academics of Imperial College London
British Army personnel of World War I
Royal Medal winners
Scientists from Glasgow
Jewish chemists